Raymond Eastwood (1 January 1915 – after 1946) is an English retired professional footballer who played as a full back in the Football League.

In 1948 he signed for Mossley making 102 appearances in two seasons with the club.

References

 

1915 births
1999 deaths
English footballers
Altrincham F.C. players
Accrington Stanley F.C. (1891) players
Aldershot F.C. players
Nelson F.C. players
English Football League players
Association football fullbacks
People from Moston, Manchester
Mossley A.F.C. players